Miss Grand Brazil is an annual female beauty pageant in Brazil, founded  in 2014 by a São Paulo-based event organizer "Gerson Antonelli", to select the country's representatives to compete in its parent international contest, Miss Grand International.  Since 2015, the pageant has been owned by Concurso Nacional de Beleza Miss Brasil (CNB Miss Brazil), led by Henrique Fontes.

In its first two editions, 2014 and 2019, all national entrants were selected by the organization directly. However, after the license was distributed to the regional organizer in 2020,  the pageant has regularly been featuring the contestants chosen by either the central organ or the licensed organizers. Since its inception, the contest was canceled once in 2021 due to the COVID-19 pandemic.

Brazil holds a record of 9 placements at Miss Grand International, the highest position was the first place won by Isabella Menin in 2022, followed by the second runner-up, obtained by Lorena Rodrigues of Minas Gerais in 2021, and the fourth runner-up in 2019 and 2020, won by "Marjorie Marcelle" and Alaíse Guedes, respectively.

The current Miss Grand Brazil is Isabella Menin of Alto Cafezal, São Paulo, who was crowned on July 28, 2022, at the Theater Caesb in Brasília, Federal District.

Background

History
Since the establishment of Miss Grand International in 2013, Brazil has always send the representatives to participate in such. Its first representative, "Tamara de Costa Bicca" top 16 fianlists Miss Brazil World 2013, was appointed by the licensee Concurso Nacional de Beleza Miss Brasil to join the international contest in Thailand where she was placed among the top 10 finalist. In the following year, the inaugural contest of the Miss Grand Brazil was held after a São Paulo-based event organizer "Gerson Antonelli" had purchased the license. The contest was held as the sub-event of the annual festival Festival Nacional do Folclore at the Anfiteatro da Casa de Cultura of Olímpia city in São Paulo on 25 July, featuring 13 contestants, in which Yameme Ibrahim of Paraná won the main title. Besides Miss Grand Brazil, CNB Miss Brazil also holds the country licenses for Miss World, Mister World as well as Miss and Mister Supranational.

The pageant was planned to be resurrected in 2017 at Hotel do Bosque Eco Resort in Angra dos Reis (RJ) on 5 May but the program, unfortunately, was rescheduled to 2019 for undisclosed reasons. Two years later, the suspended program was finally held on 28 February at Dall'Onder Grande Hotel in Bento Gonçalves of Rio Grande do Sul state, with 22 candidates representing each federative unit of Brazil participating, and the event has been held annually since then.

After its first postponement in 2017, the pageant, originally planned to be held on 12 October, has been canceled once again in 2021, resulting from the widespread COVID-19 infection in Brazil, which exceeds more than twenty thousand new positive cases per day in the second half of the year. Therefore, the director decided to assign the second runner-up of the 2019 contest – Lorena Rodrigues – to participate in the international edition, in which she finished as the second runner-up.

Editions

Selection of contestants
The Miss Grand Brazil pageant has been licensing the participant rights to the local agency since 2019. The regional licensees then select their representatives through either the local contest, internal casting, or by a hand-picking. In the 2022 edition, at least 13 federative units of Brazil (i.e., Goiás, Mato Grosso do Sul, Minas Gerais) held the state pageant or casting event to determine the finalists for Miss Grand Brazil 2022. Moreover, the national organizer also receives the application directly to choose the supplementary national finalists.

Titleholders

National finalists
The following list is the national finalists of the Miss Grand Brazil pageant, as well as the competition results.

Color keys
 Declared as the winner
 Ended as a runner-up (Top 5)
 Ended as a semifinalist (Top 8,9)
 Ended as a semifinalist (Top 12)
 Ended as a semifinalist (Top 15,16)
 Did not participate
 Withdraw during the competition

References

External links

 Miss Grand Brazil official website

Recurring events established in 2014
Grand Brazil